Roy Edwin Lee (September 28, 1917 – November 11, 1985) was an American baseball player and collegiate coach. He was a  Major League Baseball pitcher who played for the New York Giants in 1945.

Coaching
Roy Lee was named the head coach of the Saint Louis University baseball program in 1960. In seven years, his  Billikens built a record of 125–84–5. His teams won the Missouri Valley Conference (MVC) regular season title in 1966 and the MVC Tournament championship in 1964–66, earning a place in the National Collegiate Athletic Association (NCAA) playoffs. Lee's Billikens placed third in the 1965 College World Series.

In 1967, Lee departed the successful Division I program at St. Louis to start the new Division II program at Southern Illinois University Edwardsville (SIUE). With no scholarships and almost no budget, he quickly built a successful program. In his eleven years as the Cougars' head coach, his teams had a record of 237–144–3 and made eight successive appearances in the NCAA playoffs. Lee's Cougars advanced to the Division II College World Series three times and finished as the 1976 runners-up.

On April 26, 1986, between the games of a double-header, the SIUE baseball field was rededicated and named Roy E. Lee Field.

References

External links
, or Retrosheet

1917 births
1985 deaths
Major League Baseball pitchers
Mount Vernon Kings players
New York Giants (NL) players
Saint Louis Billikens baseball coaches
SIU Edwardsville Cougars baseball coaches
Sportspeople from Elmira, New York
Baseball players from New York (state)
Canton Terriers players
Centreville Colts players
Columbus Red Birds players
Denver Bears players
Hopkinsville Hoppers players
Houston Buffaloes players
Madison Blues players
Omaha Cardinals players
Richmond Colts players
Thomasville Orioles players